William Donlon Edwards (January 6, 1915 – October 1, 2015) was an American politician of the Democratic Party and a member of the United States House of Representatives from California for 32 years in the late 20th century.

Early life
Edwards was born in San Jose, California to Republican parents. His father and grandfather owned a land title business. After graduating from San Jose High School, Edwards earned a B.A. from Stanford University in 1936, where he was member of the Stanford golf team. Edwards then attended Stanford Law School and was admitted to the bar in 1940.

Edwards was a special agent for the Federal Bureau of Investigation from 1940 to 1941, when he joined the United States Navy as a naval intelligence and gunnery officer during World War II. In 1950, he was elected president of the California Young Republicans, resigning after joining the United World Federalists. Perceiving the Republican Party as becoming too conservative, he became a Democrat prior to his first congressional election victory in 1962. He was the president of Valley Title Company of Santa Clara County from 1951 to 1975, and a delegate to the Democratic National Conventions of 1964 and 1968.

United States representative (1963–95)
Edwards was elected as a member of the Democratic Party to the 88th from the 10th Congressional District (later redistricted to the 16th Congressional District) and to the fifteen succeeding Congresses (January 3, 1963 – January 3, 1995). In his first year in the House, Edwards voted to abolish the House Un-American Activities Committee. Edwards was involved in the passage of the Civil Rights Act of 1964 and the Voting Rights Act of 1965. Edwards was a member of the House Judiciary Committee during the investigation of the Watergate scandal. Edwards opposed the U.S. military involvement in the Vietnam War, the invasion of Panama, and the Persian Gulf War.

Edwards was one of eight members of the Judiciary Committee to vote for all five articles of impeachment drafted against President Richard Nixon during the Watergate scandal. The others were Jack Brooks, Robert Kastenmeier, John Conyers, Barbara Jordan, Charles Rangel, Elizabeth Holtzman and Edward Mezvinsky. Three of the five articles were adopted prior to Nixon's resignation on August 9, 1974.

Edwards was one of the House impeachment managers appointed by the House of Representatives in 1988 to conduct the impeachment trial of Alcee Hastings, judge of the United States District Court for the Southern District of Florida. However, he was replaced as an impeachment manager before the trial started. However, in 1989, he was appointed and served as a House impeachment manager in the impeachment trial of Walter Nixon, judge of the United States District Court for the Southern District of Mississippi. Edwards was the chairman of the House Subcommittee on Civil Liberties and Civil Rights for 23 years. Edwards was not a candidate for reelection to the 104th Congress.

Personal life and death
Don Edwards was married three times; he was married to Edith Wilkie Edwards from 1981 until her death in 2011. He turned 100 in January 2015. He died later that year on October 1, 2015.

Legacy
Edwards received the Congressional Distinguished Service Award in 2003. The Don Edwards San Francisco Bay National Wildlife Refuge in the south end of San Francisco Bay is named in his honor.

See also

List of centenarians (politicians and civil servants)

References

External links

Don Edwards Congressional Papers
American Bar Association Human Rights Magazine biography
record maintained by the Washington Post
Spartacus Educational Biography
 

1915 births
2015 deaths
American centenarians
United States Navy personnel of World War II
American country singer-songwriters
California Republicans
Federal Bureau of Investigation agents
Members of the United States House of Representatives from California
Politicians from San Jose, California
Stanford Cardinal men's golfers
Stanford Law School alumni
United States Navy officers
United States Navy sailors
20th-century American politicians
Men centenarians
Democratic Party members of the United States House of Representatives from California
Singer-songwriters from California
Military personnel from California